James Ravilious (22 August 1939 – 29 September 1999), was an English photographer, who specialised in recording the rural life of north Devon.

Early life
Ravilious was born in Eastbourne, the second son of the neo-romantic artist Eric Ravilious and his wife, the artist Tirzah Garwood, and educated at Bedford School.

Having studied as an accountant, Ravilious made a career change and entered St Martin's School of Art in London, under the assumed name of Souryer in 1959. He subsequently worked as a teacher at Hammersmith College for seven years.

Photography
Inspired by an exhibition of the work of French photographer Henri Cartier-Bresson, Ravilious took up photography shortly after moving with his wife to Devon in the 1970s.  He was asked to contribute work to the Beaford Archive, a means of documenting images to show the lifestyle associated with a small area of North Devon.  What began as a short-term project turned into a 17-year quest. Ravilious made some 80,000 black and white images for Beaford Arts, and preserved some 5,000 old photographs of the area. The archive is an internationally important collection. An exhibition of his work The English Countryside was shown at Royal Photographic Society's Octagon exhibition space in 1981.

Personal life
In 1970 Ravilious married Caroline (known as Robin) Whistler, daughter of glass-engraver and poet Laurence Whistler. They had two children.

Publications

 Ravilious, James. Heart of the Country. London: Scolar, 1980. 
 Ravilious, James. A Corner of England: North Devon Landscapes and People. Tiverton: Devon, 1996. 
 Hamilton, Peter. An English Eye: The Photographs of James Ravilious. Tiverton: Devon, 1998. . 
 Ravilious, James. Down the Deep Lanes. Devon, 2001. 
 Ravilious, James. The Recent Past. with an Introduction by Robin Ravilious, London: Wilmington Square, 2017. 
 Ravilious, Robin. James Ravilious: a Life. London: Wilmington Square, 2017.

References

External links
 
 The Beaford Archive
 James Ravilious: A World in Photographs, 30-minute documentary by Banyak Films 2006
 "The History Boy": Andrew Dickson interviews Alan Bennett on Ravilious's work. The Guardian, 15 November 2007.

1939 births
1999 deaths
Photographers from Devon
People educated at Bedford School
People from Eastbourne